"Forever Love" (stylized in all caps) is a song by Japanese singer-songwriters Miliyah Kato and Shota Shimizu, from Shimizu's second studio album Journey (2010) and their first collaborative album, The Best (2014). The song was written by Kato and Shimizu, while the production handled by Japanese production team, 3rd Productions. The single was released for the two versions of CD and digital download on 3 February 2010 through Mastersix Foundation as the third single from Journey. Ahead of the release, the short version of the song was released on 12 December 2009 as a ringtone.

"Forever Love" is a dance-pop track with a dance beat. The song was written as the answer song to the duo's previous collaboration, "Love Forever" (2009). The single reached number 3 on the Billboard Japan Hot 100 and peaked at number 4 on the Oricon Weekly Singles Chart. "Forever Love" has been certified double platinum for its digital sales sold and triple platinum for its ringtone sales. Kato and Shimizu has promoted the song with several televised live performances such as Music Station.

Commercial performance
In Japan, "Forever Love" debuted at number 61 on the Billboard Japan Hot 100 dated 18 January 2010. It peaked at number three in its fifth peak. In June 2010, "Forever Love" was certified double platinum by the Recording Industry Association of Japan with more than 500,000 units downloaded. The song was also given a triple platinum certification for more than 750,000 ringtones downloaded. On the Oricon Weekly Singles Chart, the single debuted at number four with the sales of 30,685 copies. It stayed on the chart for 12 consecutive weeks, selling 60,101 in total.

Track listing

Charts

Weekly charts

Year-end charts

Certification and sales

|-
! scope="row"| Japan Digital (RIAJ)
| 2×Platinum
| 500,00
|-
! scope="row"| Japan Ringtones (RIAJ)
| 3×Platinum
| 750,00
|-
! scope="row"| Japan CD (RIAJ)
| 
| 60,101
|-
|}

Release history

References

2010 singles
2010 songs
J-pop songs
Miliyah Kato songs
RIAJ Digital Track Chart number-one singles
Mastersix Foundation singles